The Masked Ones is a 1920 German silent film directed by Franz Seitz and starring William Dieterle, Karl Günther and Friedrich August Koch.

It was shot at the Bavaria Studios in Munich.

Cast
 William Dieterle as Bernard
 Karl Günther as Richard Gibbon
 Friedrich August Koch as Allan Lynn
 Klara Putze as Lucy Hénault
 Hans Staufen as Fremder

References

Bibliography
 Bock, Hans-Michael & Bergfelder, Tim. The Concise CineGraph. Encyclopedia of German Cinema. Berghahn Books, 2009.

External links

1920 films
Films of the Weimar Republic
German silent feature films
Films directed by Franz Seitz
German black-and-white films
Bavaria Film films
Films shot at Bavaria Studios
1920s German films